Since 1998 the Nuclear-Free Future Award (NFFA) is an award given to anti-nuclear activists, organizations and communities. The award is intended to promote opposition to uranium mining, nuclear weapons and nuclear power.

The NFFA is a project of the Franz Moll Foundation for the Coming Generations and gives out awards in three categories: Resistance ($10,000 prize), Education ($10,000 prize) and Solutions ($10,000 prize). Additional optional categories are Lifetime Achievement and Special Recognition (contemporary work of art). The award ceremonies take place all around the world.

The NFFA is financed by donations, charity events, and benefit auctions.

Laureates 

The Nuclear-Free Future Award Laureates:

See also 
 List of nuclear whistleblowers
 List of peace activists
 William and Katherine Estes Award
 Non-nuclear future
 Nuclear Free World Policy
 World Uranium Hearing
 Anti-nuclear movement
 Nuclear disarmament
 List of environmental awards

References

External links 
The Nuclear Free Future Award

Anti-nuclear movement
Environmental awards
Lifetime achievement awards